Quit lit is a literary genre of autobiographical apologia, issued publicly, when leaving a job or industry, particularly the academic field.

References 

 
 
 
 http://acsh.org/news/2015/09/14/quit-lit-academics-discover-theres-real-science-outside-universities/

Literary genres
Academia